The 2022 United States House of Representatives elections in West Virginia was held on November 8, 2022, to elect the two U.S. representatives from the State of West Virginia, one from each of the state's two congressional districts. The elections coincided with other elections to the House of Representatives, elections to the United States Senate, as well as various state and local elections.

District boundaries were redrawn to ensure that the districts are apportioned based on data from the 2020 census, which got rid of a congressional district in West Virginia's delegation.

Overview

District 1

The 1st district encompasses Southern West Virginia, taking in Huntington, Charleston, Bluefield, Princeton and Beckley.

Republican primary

Candidates

Nominee
Carol Miller, incumbent U.S. Representative (2019–present)

Eliminated in primary
Scott Fuller
James Houser
Kent Stevens, businessman

Endorsements

Results

Democratic primary

Candidates

Nominee

Results

General election

Predictions

Results

District 2

The 2nd district encompasses the industrial areas of the northern Panhandle including Wheeling, Fairmont, Clarksburg, Morgantown and Parkersburg, as well as the eastern Panhandle.

Republican primary

Candidates

Nominee
Alex Mooney, incumbent U.S. Representative (2015–present)

Eliminated in primary
Susan Buchser-Lochocki, artist
Rhonda Hercules
David McKinley, incumbent U.S. Representative (2011–present)
Mike Seckman

Withdrawn
Michael Sisco, political consultant (endorsed Mooney)

Endorsements

Polling
Graphical summary

Results

Democratic primary

Candidates

Nominee
Barry Lee Wendell, former Morgantown city councilor

Eliminated in primary
Angela Dwyer

Results

General election

Predictions

Results

Notes

Partisan clients

References

External links
Official campaign websites for 1st district candidates
Carol Miller (R) for Congress
Lacy Watson (D) for Congress

Official campaign websites for 2nd district candidates
Alex Mooney (R) for Congress
Barry Wendell (D) for Congress

2022
West Virginia
United States House of Representatives